Dani Donadi (born November 25, 1967) is an Italian film composer and record producer born in Treviso (near Venice), Italy. After studying composition, orchestration and sound engineering in Italy and France, he moved to the United States in 1988 and now lives in Orlando, Florida. He has composed original scores for feature films, TV shows, stage shows, musicals and Universal Studios attractions.
He also served as the composer and audio director of the Super Nintendo World theme park at Universal Studios Japan and received a Thea Award for Outstanding Achievement in Music.

Discography 

2019 - Cypress Inheritance (Video Game Soundtrack)

2021 - The Great Journey

References

External links
Official Website

American film score composers
American male film score composers
Italian composers
Italian emigrants to the United States
Italian record producers
People from Treviso
Living people
1967 births